Che with vertical stroke (Ҹ ҹ; italics: Ҹ ҹ) is a letter of the Cyrillic script. Its form is derived from the Cyrillic letter Che (Ч ч Ч ч).

In Altai, it represents 
the voiced alveolo-palatal affricate /dʑ/.

From 1958 until 1991, it was used in the Azerbaijani alphabet to represent ; in this alphabet it is found in the name of Azerbaijan: «». The Azerbaijani Cyrillic alphabet and  continue to be used to write Azerbaijani in Dagestan.

Computing codes

See also
Cyrillic characters in Unicode

References

Cyrillic letters with diacritics
Letters with stroke